Gulliver's Kingdom (also known as Gulliver's Matlock Bath) is a theme park aimed at children aged 3-13 in the Derbyshire town of Matlock Bath, England. The park was founded in 1978 by Ray and Hilary Phillips as a model village, before later expanding to include a small train and some second hand rides. Gulliver's Kingdom is close to the site of the Victorian Switchback rollercoaster ride, after which the theme park's main rollercoaster was eventually named. In the early 1980s, a hotel and chalets were built. In 2017, the themed accommodation area was rebranded as the Explorers Retreat. The Philips Family still own Gulliver's Kingdom in the present day.

See also
Gulliver's Land
Gulliver's World
Gulliver's Valley

References

External links 
Official Website
Interview with the Gulliver's Managing Director

Amusement parks in England
Tourist attractions in Derbyshire
Tourist attractions of the Peak District